Stunting is a type of publicity stunt in radio broadcasting, where a station—abruptly and often without advance announcement—begins to air content that is seemingly uncharacteristic compared to what is normally played.

Stunting is typically used to generate publicity and audience attention for upcoming changes to a station's programming, such as new branding, format, or as a soft launch for a newly-established station. Occasionally, a stunt may be purely intended as publicity or a protest, and not actually result in a major programming change. Stunts often involve a loop of a single song, or an interim format (such as the discography of a specific artist, Christmas music, a specific theme, or novelty songs), which may sometimes include hints towards the station's new format or branding.

To a lesser extent, stunting has also been seen on television, most commonly in conjunction with April Fools' Day, or to emphasize a major programming event being held by a channel.

Types of radio stunting and noted examples

Continuous loop
A station may stunt by repeating the same song, playlist, or other content on a continuous loop:
 The song(s) in question are commonly a clue towards the incoming format or branding, such as was the case in March 2014 when San Francisco Regional Mexican station KVVF/KVVZ stunted with a loop of "Hot in Herre" by Nelly for three days. This led into the stations' relaunch as rhythmic contemporary Hot 105.7. The stunt notably attracted mainstream media attention, with the hashtag "#nelly1057" being used to discuss the event on Twitter.
 In late June 2022, CKKS-FM in Greater Vancouver similarly faced mainstream media attention when it played a loop of "Killing in the Name" by Rage Against the Machine as part of its transition from hot adult contemporary Kiss to modern rock Sonic. The loop included staged segments of DJs discussing their repeated playing of the song, and "callers" either requesting "Killing in the Name" or asking for a different song—which led to a false impression that its employees had commandeered the station to protest staffing changes associated with the format change.
 Oftentimes the song chosen for the loop does not pertain to either the old or new format: in one of the oldest radio stunts recorded, WNOE-AM/New Orleans on February 14, 1955, played "Shtiggy Boom" by The Nuggets nonstop for 58 hours and 45 minutes before the launch of its Top 40 format two days later, which made national headlines on its stunt. In 2013, the new Toronto radio station CIND-FM played a loop of Rick Astley's "Never Gonna Give You Up" in reference to the Rickroll meme, prior to its official launch as adult album alternative Indie 88.
 For four days before the July 8, 2012, relaunch of KOKE-FM/Austin — a station which popularized progressive country in the early 1970s, a live recording of Dale Watson's "Country My Ass" played in a continuous loop.  This example of stunting is notable for the station-specific nature of the song's lyrics; Watson re-recorded the song for the occasion, adding a new coda in which he sings, "Now Austin's on track, 'cause KOKE-FM's back."
 In May 1990, the staff of Australian Broadcasting Corporation radio station Triple J staged an industrial action, after its news director was suspended for playing a clip of the N.W.A. song "Fuck tha Police" in a segment discussing its subject matter (despite the full song having been played by the station before without incident). During the action, Triple J played another N.W.A. song, "Express Yourself" (whose lyrics criticize censorship of rap music), 82 times in a row. Triple J paid homage to the event during the April 30, 2014 relaunch of digital radio station ABC Dig Music as Double J, which was preceded by a stunt loop of 13 different versions of "Express Yourself" (including the original recording, and covers of the song by Australian musicians).
 WJMP/Kent, OH, in a protest over the Major League Baseball players' strike, continuously played two versions of "Take Me Out to the Ball Game" sunrise-to-sunset (the station operated only during daytime hours), for two months (and 57,161 total plays) from August to October 1994. The stunt merited WJMP an entry in the Guinness Book of Sports Records.
 In honor of the alleged Mayan apocalypse, modern rock station CFEX-FM/Calgary stunted with a loop of R.E.M.'s song "It's The End Of The World As We Know It (And I Feel Fine)" on December 21, 2012, interspersed with "Apocalypse Survival Tips" and "Get to Know a Mayan" segments.
In a non-music example, the launch of Black Information Network—a chain of iHeartMedia news radio stations targeting African Americans—featured its initial stations playing a loop of speeches by prominent African Americans, mixed with sweepers promoting the launch date, and containing the tagline "Our side of the story is about to be told."

Temporary formats
Occasionally a station dropping an old format will stunt with a transitional format, either containing clues and previews relating to the new format (such as songs referencing its new branding, and artists who may be included in the eventual format), or having little to do with it. This can include songs based on specific themes (such as a single musician), or novelties that would not be viable as a permanent format. In some cases (sometimes referred to as a "wheel of formats"), a station may cycle between multiple formats during the stunt until the new, permanent format launches.

 In 2006, after its sale to new owners, KFYE in Kingsburg, California, dropped its contemporary Christian music programming for a stunt format it dubbed "Porn Radio", featuring songs with sexually-suggestive lyrics, and songs edited to include moaning sounds. The stunt led into its relaunch as rhythmic adult contemporary Sexy 106.3.
 In May 2009, WSKS/Utica, New York, announced that due to "financial constraints" its CHR format would be replaced by the beautiful music format similar to what was broadcast on sister station WUTQ. The "change" came complete with on-air kayfabe-style complaining from the station's staff. The "new format," however, lasted for only two hours before WSKS management came clean, restored the CHR format, and confirmed the stunt was a way to promote the station's new lineup.
 As a publicity stunt for the program by local broadcaster Global, Toronto radio station CIRR-FM (which usually broadcasts a CHR format targeting the LGBT community) temporarily rebranded as Glee FM on April 12, 2010, adding music from the U.S. musical comedy-drama series Glee to its playlist. On August 16, 2010, British radio station Oxford's FM 107.9 held its own Glee FM stunt, leading into its August 18 relaunch as Glide FM.
 Over Memorial Day weekend in 2010, WJZX-FM/Milwaukee, Wisconsin, stunted as Tiger 106.9, featuring songs about cheating (in reference to an infidelity scandal involving golfer Tiger Woods). The station was expected to change to a top 40 format with the new call letters WNQW—with the new calls suggesting that its branding would involve the name "Now". However, competing station WQBW abruptly moved to introduce the same format and branding as 97.3 Now, preventing WJZX from using the name. The station continued airing temporary formats (such as patriotic music and The Beatles' discography in alphabetical order), before settling on a permanent format in June 2010, as classic country station WZBK-FM (the station eventually adopted a rhythmic top 40 format in September 2012 as Energy 106.9). 
 In 2011, WWWN/Chicago and WEMP/New York—which had recently been sold to Merlin Media—transitioned from alternative rock to all-news radio as FM News. As a transitional format, both stations aired a format branded as FM New, which featured adult contemporary music interspersed with news, traffic, and weather updates from personalities who would serve under the new FM News formats.
 On October 8, 2014, KROI/Houston ended its all-news format and began stunting as B92, playing only music by Houston-native Beyoncé. The stunt led into its relaunch as classic hip-hop Boom 92.
 KEGY/San Diego used an unbranded mainstream rock format as part of its transition from CHR to a new hot talk-oriented format in 2018. The stunt's playlist featured Pink Floyd's "Welcome to the Machine" at the top of each hour, which teased its eventual branding as The Machine.
 Multiple stations in the United States and Canada have stunted with Chinese music under the branding Kung Pao, such as KDOG (which led into a flip to classic hits), WVHT (which led into its re-launch as CHR Hot 100), and CIGM (which led into its re-launch as CHR Hot 93.5).

Christmas music and other holiday formats
The popular practice of radio stations playing all-Christmas music during the lead-up to (and occasionally the week after) Christmas Day has sometimes been used as a transitional period between formats. As of 2022, there were over 660 radio stations in North America that stunt Christmas music throughout each holiday season, with 627 stations in the United States and 33 stations in Canada. Sometimes, Christmas music is used as a more blatant stunt format outside of the holiday season, in a similar spirit to ironic "Christmas in July" promotions.

 In April 2008, new Saskatoon radio station CFWD-FM stunted with Christmas music as Santa FM as part of its soft launch, accompanied by a promotional campaign in which publicists in Santa Claus costumes paraded through the city. The station officially launched as CHR-formatted Wired 96.3 on April 11. In November 2012, the station laid off its airstaff and flipped to Christmas music for the season, emerging as adult hits 96.3 Cruz FM on December 26, 2012.
 In late-September 2015, Duluth's WEBC dropped its sports radio format in favor of Ho Ho 106.5, before emerging in early-October as classic rock Sasquatch 106.5.
On October 7, 2015, as a parody of Christmas creep and stations trying to achieve notoriety for being the first to switch to Christmas music, WURV/Richmond 103.7 Play briefly stunted for 12 hours with "inappropriately early" Christmas music.
WURV's sister station WJSR conducted an unusually-long Christmas music stunt lasting from October 13, 2020 to March 4, 2021 as Santa 100.9, after having initially stunted with snippets of songs as "Short Attention Span Radio" from October 1. After just over five months of stunting in total, WJSR flipped to classic hits Awesome 100.9 on March 4, 2021.
In November 2017, CBS Radio and Entercom merged, bringing Seattle's two country music stations, KMPS and KKWF, under common ownership. On the day the merger was completed, KMPS switched to Christmas music, ostensibly for the holiday season. However, on the morning of December 4, 2017, KMPS abruptly ended the all-Christmas programming and flipped to soft adult contemporary as 94.1 The Sound. The following year, Entercom's Detroit station WDZH emulated the flip, with the station dropping its Amp Radio CHR format for The Rudolph Network @ 98.7, before becoming soft AC The Breeze three days later.

Other 
 On October 2, 2009, following a half-hour retrospective marking the end of its smooth jazz format, WVMV/Detroit purportedly flipped to classic rock under its former Detroit's Wheels WLLZ branding. However, in the midst of playing "Welcome to the Jungle" by Guns N' Roses, the song was interrupted by a sequence referencing Kanye West's interruption of a Taylor Swift acceptance speech at the 2009 MTV Video Music Awards. The bait-and-switch led into the soft launch of a CHR format under the branding 98.7 Takeover; which officially launched as 98.7 Amp Radio the following Monday.
 On January 7, 2019, country station KSED/Sedona began stunting with a speaking clock counting down to 6:00 a.m. on January 14, 2019. The stunt—which led into a rebranding with no change in format—prompted the Flagstaff Police Department to issue a statement clarifying that, despite concerns from residents, this was a promotional event with no harm intended.
 In 2018 and 2020, iHeartMedia used multiple stunts as part of its repositioning and relaunch of CHR station KBKS-FM in Seattle. 
 In late-October 2018 approaching Halloween, the station dropped its on-air personalities, and began to air promos and sweepers implicating the end of its existing Kiss format. Later, the station began to interrupt songs with a demonic voiceover stating that "Kiss is dead", and air promos teasing an announcement on October 31. At that time, the station announced that it would revamp its on-air lineup with no change in format, explaining the prior stunt by stating that they were "dead serious" about finding "Seattle's Funniest Person" to join its morning show (as part of an accompanying contest). 
 In July 2020, KBKS announced that it had hired Jubal Fresh, the former co-host of KQMV's nationally-syndicated morning show Brooke & Jubal—to host a new morning show on the station. On August 3, 2020, the station temporarily rebranded as Jubal 106.1 to promote the impending launch of The Jubal Show, after which it adopted its new branding—Hits 106.1—on August 20 to coincide with its premiere.

On television
Cartoon Network has broadcast its share of stunts over the years, many on April Fools' Day. On April 1, 1997, the network aired a stunt where it had purportedly been taken over by Screwy Squirrel, and subsequently broadcast the Screwy Squirrel cartoon "Happy-Go-Nutty" for 12 hours straight. Numerous complaints were received about this particular event, generally fielded by Cartoon Network's cable providers, who had been left in the dark about the stunt. Later April Fools' Day stunts on Cartoon Network have included an 11 hour Cow and Chicken marathon in place of a scheduled Chowder marathon on April 1, 2009, and 14 hours of programming edited to have googly eyes on April 1, 2017.

Cartoon Network's late-night block Adult Swim has held a number of their own April Fools' programming stunts, such as promoting a television premiere of Aqua Teen Hunger Force Colon Movie Film for Theaters before its theatrical release (but displaying it in a comically-small window over regularly-scheduled programming), airings of the Tommy Wiseau film The Room, episodes of Aqua Teen Hunger Force and Rick and Morty redubbed by children and edited to be family-friendly ("Adult Swim Junior"), and an airing of its anime block Toonami with programs in their original Japanese audio with subtitles (including an airing of Masaaki Yuasa's 2004 experimental film Mind Game). The stunts have sometimes included unannounced previews and premieres of new and existing series, such as additional episodes of Perfect Hair Forever after its supposed series finale, the third season premiere of Rick and Morty, and an unannounced world premiere of the first episode of FLCLs third season before its second season had even premiered in the U.S. yet.

For 35 days in early-1998, Birmingham, Alabama's CBS affiliate WBMG—which had recently been acquired by Media General—stunted during the usual timeslots of its local newscasts with a clock counting down to a major relaunch of the station (and its fledgling news department) on February 5.

Nick Jr. Too, a sister to the British Nick Jr. channel, has occasionally aired long-term marathons of Peppa Pig, during which it has branded as "Nick Jr. Peppa". In a similar manner, Sky Sports has also temporarily rebranded some of its channels to devote them specifically to certain major events, such as The Ashes series in cricket (Sky Sports Ashes), the PDC World Darts Championship (Sky Sports Darts; in 2015, this used the Sky Sports F1 channel, since Formula One was in its off-season), and golf's Open Championship (Sky Sports The Open). In January 2019, Sky Sports Action was temporarily renamed "Sky Sports USA", with programming focusing on the National Basketball Association (coinciding with the playing of the NBA Global Games series in London), and the National Football League playoffs and Super Bowl LIII.

At least three networks have used stunting-type events prior to their formal launches: G4, for example, aired a 7 day long game of Pong before its formal debut on April 24, 2002. This stunt would later be referenced by the network in its final minute on air on December 31, 2014, as well as in the video announcing its 2021 return. MLB Network aired a continuous loop of baseball highlights and promos as a "soft launch" in the weeks before its formal debut on January 1, 2009. Canada's Sun News Network employed an on-screen countdown clock graphic in the hours before its April 18, 2011, launch.

Since 2017, one of ESPN's networks has stunted as "ESPN8" on or near August 8 (8/8), carrying a marathon of programming featuring obscure and unconventional sporting events and competitions, such as chess boxing, disc golf, dodgeball, esports, Highland games, kabaddi, lawn mower racing, mini-golf, and roller derby. The stunt pays tribute to a fictitious eighth ESPN network of the same name portrayed in the 2004 sports comedy film DodgeBall: A True Underdog Story (nicknamed "The Ocho", in reference to ESPN2 being nicknamed "The Deuce" on launch), which carries coverage of competitions that are "almost a sport". The stunt was originally held on ESPNU—a channel that normally carries college sports events during the academic year, but moved to ESPN2 beginning in 2018. DodgeBall has also been screened as part of this lineup since 2018.

References

Radio broadcasting
Radio formats
Publicity stunts